Mesadenocoris is a genus of true bugs belonging to the family Aradidae.

Species:
 Mesadenocoris robustus Kirman, 1985

References

Aradidae
Pentatomomorpha genera